John Rutledge may refer to:

 John Rutledge (1739–1800), Governor of South Carolina and second Chief Justice of the U.S. Supreme Court
 John Rutledge Jr. (1766–1819), U.S. Representative from South Carolina
 a ship sunk by an iceberg in 1856 with the loss of 118 lives